The Pitcairn PA-2 Sesquiwing "Arrow" is an early biplane designed for air racing and commercial airmail service.

Design
The Sesquiwing featured a quick change motor mount to accommodate a Curtiss C-6 or Curtiss OX-5 engine, and wheel fairings for speed.

Operational history
A specially built PA-2 was flown by Jim Ray in the 1926 Ford National Reliability Air Tour. It placed second in a race for engines under 800 cubic inches displacement, then it had its engine swapped to an OX-5 for a race the next day, and again back to a Curtiss C-6 engine the next day to win the Detroit race.

Specifications (Pitcairn PA-2 Sesquiwing - C-6 engine)

References

Notes

Bibliography

PA-02
1920s United States mailplanes
Single-engined tractor aircraft
Biplanes
Aircraft first flown in 1926